The Mercedes-Benz M09 engine is a naturally-aspirated, 3.4-liter, straight-6, internal combustion piston engine, designed, developed and produced by Mercedes-Benz; between 1928 and 1929.

Applications
Mercedes-Benz W03

References

Mercedes-Benz engines
Straight-six engines
Engines by model
Gasoline engines by model